Wendell Cherry (September 25, 1935 – July 16, 1991) was an American lawyer, entrepreneur, art collector and patron. The company he co-founded, Humana, grew under his leadership to become the largest hospital operator in the United States. In the 1980s he also built one of the country's most important art collections.

Life and career
Cherry was born in 1935 in Horse Cave, a rural community in Kentucky, to a grocery wholesaler, Layman S. Cherry, and his wife, Geneva (born Spillman). He was a member of the Kappa Sigma Fraternity, studied business administration and graduated in 1957. He graduated with a Bachelor of Laws in 1959. During this time he worked as chief editor of the Kentucky Law Journal.

Family
Cherry first married Mary Elizabeth Baird. Then married interior designer Dorothy O'Connell, and lived in Louisville and New York.

Sports promoter
Cherry belonged in the 1960s to a group of citizens from Louisville, who supported Louisville native Cassius Clay (later known as Muhammad Ali) in his early heavyweight boxing career. He worked as a lawyer for the group, collecting money from the sponsors for Clay.

Art collector
The American art magazine Art & Antiques named Cherry in 1985 among the 100 most important art collectors of the United States. The reputation of his collection was not only because of the quality of the works, but also for the sometimes very high prices that he paid for these pictures and scored from subsequent sales. A record-breaking example of these works was Pablo Picasso's self-portrait Yo, Picasso. Cherry purchased the picture in 1981 at Sotheby's for $5.3 million, at the time the highest amount ever paid for a Picasso painting.

Philanthropy
Cherry was one of the driving forces in establishing The Kentucky Center for the Performing Arts in 1983. From 1980 to 1987, he led this institution as CEO (board chairman). In 1990, he acquired the painting Funeral of a Mummy by American painter Frederick Arthur Bridgman for the Speed Art Museum in Louisville, on whose board he was a member.

In the field of academia, Cherry endowed the University of Kentucky College of Law with $100,000 for the H. Wendell Cherry Professor of Law. He also endowed two chairs dedicated to medicine at the   School of Medicine, the Wendell Cherry Chair in Clinical Trial Research and The Wendell Cherry Chair in Cancer Translational Research.

References

Sources
 John E. Kleber: The Encyclopedia of Louisville. University Press of Kentucky, Lexington 200, .
 Sotheby's New York (Hrsg.): Property from the Estate of Wendell Cherry. Auctions Catalog Sale 6565, Sotheby's New York, New York 1994.

1935 births
1991 deaths
American art collectors
American patrons of the arts
People from Hart County, Kentucky
Businesspeople from Louisville, Kentucky
University of Kentucky College of Law alumni
University of Louisville faculty
20th-century American businesspeople